Coon Island may refer to:

 Coon Island (California)
 Coon Island (Oregon)
 Pirrita Island, formerly known as Coon Island (Australia)
 Coon Island (Pennsylvania)
 Coon Island (Ontario)
 Coon Island (Washington)
 Coon Island (South Carolina)

 Coon Bone Island, West Virginia
 Coon Island Township, Butler County, Missouri